The Cherry Valence is an American garage rock band from Raleigh, North Carolina. The group's sound is indebted to 1970s hard rock, and the group has the unusual distinction of two members who switch off on lead vocals and drums. They formed in 1998 and toured relentlessly across the US, releasing their first recording (a 7") in 1999. Two LPs for Estrus Records followed before bassist Siler and guitarist Kumar left the group to form Birds of Avalon in 2004. Adding new members to the group, they released a third full length on Bifocal Media in mid-2005.

Cherry Valence is a reference to the character from The Outsiders (novel), a 1967 novel by S. E. Hinton, subsequently made into the 1983 film of the same name.

Members
Current members
Jamie Williams - guitar
Brian Quast - drums, vocals, keyboards
Nick Whitley - drums, vocals
Erik Sugg - guitar
Charles Story - bass

Former members
Cheetie Kumar - guitar
Paul Siler - bass

Discography
The Cherry Valence (Estrus Records, 2001)
Riffin''' (Estrus, 2002)
 Revival EP (Flapping Jet, 2002)TCV3 (Bifocal Media, 2005)

References

[ Cherry Valence] at Allmusic
Review, Independent Weekly''
Review, PopMatters

Rock music groups from North Carolina
Musical groups from Raleigh, North Carolina